Ann Philippa Wylie (born 12 April 1922) is a New Zealand botanist, and was an associate professor at the University of Otago before her retirement in 1987.

Early life and family
Wylie was born on 12 April 1922, the daughter of noted surgeon David Storer Wylie, who survived the sinking of the SS Marquette in 1915, and his second wife, Isobel Edith Wylie (née Daplyn). She was educated at Nga Tawa Diocesan School near Marton, and went on to study at the University of Otago. She completed her Master of Science with first-class honours in botany in 1945, and a Diploma of Honours in zoology the following year. She began working at the Wheat Research Institute at Lincoln in November 1946, carrying out experimental and statistical work. Also in 1946, Wylie was awarded a postgraduate science scholarship by the University of New Zealand, to fund two years of overseas study.

Academic career 
In 1944, Wylie was completing her honours degree in the Department of Botany at the University of Otago when Professor John Holloway retired suddenly through ill health. Alongside Betty Batham, Margaret Cookson and Brenda Shore, Wylie took up teaching to keep the department going. Wylie submitted her Masters thesis, titled Vascular anatomy of New Zealand's malvaceous trees in 1945, while resident in St Margaret's College.  

Wylie went to the University of London in 1947, and then lectured at the University of Manchester. Returning to New Zealand, she worked in the Department of Botany at the University of Otago, setting up courses on cytology and genetics, and teaching both zoology and botany students.

According to an interview given in her nineties, Wylie recalled that "women were well accepted in zoology and botany and she did not experience prejudice, though she also notes that women lecturers behaved as ‘honorary men’; it was they who had to adapt rather than the men."

Wylie rose to associate professor before retiring in 1987.

In 2017, Wylie was selected as one of the Royal Society Te Apārangi's 150 women in 150 words. She celebrated her 100th birthday on 12 April 2022.

Selected works

References

External links 
Interview (with photo) with Wylie about life as a resident of St Margaret's College during the war

1922 births
Living people
University of Otago alumni
Academic staff of the University of Otago
New Zealand women botanists
Alumni of the University of London
20th-century New Zealand botanists
New Zealand women academics
New Zealand expatriates in England
People educated at Nga Tawa Diocesan School
20th-century New Zealand women scientists
New Zealand centenarians
Women centenarians